As of July 2022, The Hawaii Open is now the Waikiki Cup. 

The Hawaii Open is a hardcourt men's and women's professional tennis tournament held annually in Honolulu, Hawaii. The tournament features players from the WTA and ATP Tours. The invitational tournament occurs immediately before the ATP Tour and WTA Tour begin the new season in late December.

The Hawaii Open features three rounds of single-elimination matches played over three days in a best two-out-of-three set format. Third sets are played as a tie-break with the first to 10 points declared the winner.

History
The Hawaii Open tennis tournament began as a Women's Tennis Association (WTA) 125K series event in 2016. During the first two years as a WTA 125K series event, the tournament was held at the Patsy T. Mink Central Oahu Regional Park. The tournament was held during Thanksgiving week in late November.

2018 Hawaii Open
In 2018, the tournament added a men's draw and became a men's and women's invitational tournament over three days, December 21, 22, and 23. The tournament featured six men and six women and moved to the Blaisdell Arena in Honolulu. The tournament also featured a pro–am at Kailua Racquet Club and a Players Party held at the Prince Waikiki.

Men's entrants

Women's entrants

2019 Hawaii Open
The 2019 Hawaii Open presented by Ward Village and Hawaii Tourism was held December 26, December 27, and December 28, in Honolulu, at the Stan Sheriff Center. The tournament featured five men and five women and moved to the Stan Sheriff Center in Honolulu. The tournament also featured a pro–am at the Four Seasons Tennis Centre and a Players Party held at Ward Village.

Men's singles

Entrants

Draw

Women's singles

Entrants

Draw
{{8TeamBracket|sets=3
| RD1=Quarterfinals
| RD2=Semifinals
| RD3=Final
| 3rd=Third Place Match

| team-width=175

| RD1-seed1=1
| RD1-team1= Danielle Collins
| RD1-score1-1= 
| RD1-score1-2= 
| RD1-score1-3= 
| RD1-seed2=
| RD1-team2=bye
| RD1-score2-1= 
| RD1-score2-2= 
| RD1-score2-3= 

| RD1-seed3=
| RD1-team3= Alyssa Tobita
| RD1-score3-1=1
| RD1-score3-2=1
| RD1-score3-3=
| RD1-seed4=
| RD1-team4= Yanina Wickmayer 
| RD1-score4-1=6
| RD1-score4-2=6
| RD1-score4-3=

| RD1-seed5=
| RD1-team5= Misaki Doi
| RD1-score5-1=
| RD1-score5-2=
| RD1-score5-3=
| RD1-seed6=
| RD1-team6=bye
| RD1-score6-1=
| RD1-score6-2=
| RD1-score6-3=

| RD1-seed7= 
| RD1-team7=bye
| RD1-score7-1= 
| RD1-score7-2= 
| RD1-score7-3= 
| RD1-seed8=2
| RD1-team8= Angelique Kerber
| RD1-score8-1= 
| RD1-score8-2= 
| RD1-score8-3= 

| RD2-seed1=1
| RD2-team1= Danielle Collins
| RD2-score1-1=6
| RD2-score1-2=6
| RD2-score1-3=
| RD2-seed2=
| RD2-team2= Yanina Wickmayer
| RD2-score2-1=3
| RD2-score2-2=4
| RD2-score2-3=

| RD2-seed3=
| RD2-team3= Misaki Doi
| RD2-score3-1=1
| RD2-score3-2=62
| RD2-score3-3=
| RD2-seed4=2
| RD2-team4= Angelique Kerber
| RD2-score4-1=6
| RD2-score4-2=77
| RD2-score4-3=

| RD3-seed1=1
| RD3-team1= Danielle Collins
| RD3-score1-1=w/o
| RD3-score1-2=
| RD3-score1-3=
| RD3-seed2=2
| RD3-team2= Angelique Kerber
| RD3-score2-1=
| RD3-score2-2=
| RD3-score2-3=
}}

Mixed doubles
A mixed doubles match was added to replace the women's singles final due to player withdrawal.
  Christian Harrison /  Danielle Collins''' def.  Sam Querrey /  Yanina Wickmayer, 6–4, 6–7(6–8), [10–6]

Past finals

WTA 125K events

Singles

Doubles

Invitational tournaments

Men's singles

Women's singles

Mixed doubles

See also
 Hawaii Open – men's tournament (1974–1984)

External links
 

 
WTA 125 tournaments
Hard court tennis tournaments in the United States
Indoor tennis tournaments
Tennis tournaments in Hawaii
Sports competitions in Honolulu